NGC 3294 is a spiral galaxy in the constellation Leo Minor. It was discovered by William Herschel on Mar 17, 1787. It is a member of the Leo II Groups, a series of galaxies and galaxy clusters strung out from the right edge of the Virgo Supercluster. The morphological class of NGC 3294 is SA(rs)bc, which means this is a spiral galaxy with no central bar (SA), an incomplete inner ring structure (rs), and moderately wound spiral arms (bc).

This galaxy has been host to a pair of supernova events. The spectrum and light curve resembled a type II core-collapse supernova similar to SN 1987A. This was determined to be a type Ia supernova.

References

External links
 
 

Unbarred spiral galaxies
Leo Minor
3294
031428